This is a list of the seasons completed by the Purdue Boilermakers men's basketball.

Season-by-season results

 Purdue forfeited 18 regular season wins (6 conference wins) and vacated 1 NCAA Tournament win and 1 NCAA Tournament loss due to use of an ineligible player during the 1995–96 season.

References

 
Purdue
Purdue Boilermakers basketball seasons